Yanting County is a county under the administration of the prefecture-level city of Mianyang, in the northeast of Sichuan Province, China.

It has an area of 1645 square kilometers, and a population of 590,000 in 2002.

Sports

The 8,000-capacity Yanting Stadium is located in Yanting County. It is used mostly for association football matches.

Climate

References

External links
Official website of Yanting County Government 

 
County-level divisions of Sichuan
Mianyang